2d Transportation Support Battalion is a logistics unit of the United States Marine Corps that is based at Marine Corps Base Camp Lejeune, North Carolina.  The battalion falls under the command of Combat Logistics Regiment 2 and the 2nd Marine Logistics Group.  The battalion was reactivated October 1, 2014.

Mission
Provide transportation and throughput support for the II Marine Expeditionary Force to facilitate the  distribution of personnel, equipment, and supplies by air, ground, and sea to provide the MEF transportation and throughput support for the distribution of supplies, personnel, and equipment.

Subordinate units
 Headquarters and Service Company
 Landing Support Company
 Motor Transport Company
 Support Company

History

1950-1991
8th Motor Transport Battalion was activated December 11, 1950 at MCB Camp Lejeune, North Carolina and was assigned to Service Command, Fleet Marine Force, Atlantic.  The battalion was detached from Service Command during July 1956 assigned directly to Fleet Marine Force, Atlantic.In August 1960 it was again reassigned to Force Troops, Fleet Marine Force, Atlantic.  On December 1, 1975 was transferred under the command of the newly formed 2d Force Service Support Group (2d FSSG). In October 1989. elements of the battalion participated in humanitarian assistance and disaster relief efforts in the Southeastern United States in response to Hurricane Hugo during September–October 1989.  The battalion deployed to Saudi Arabia in December 1990.  It supported combat operations during the Gulf War and returned to the United States is April 1991.

1992–Present
In August-September 1992 elements  of the battalion participated in humanitarian assistance and disaster relief efforts in Florida after Hurricane Andrew.  From September 1994 through March 1995 the battalion supported Operation Uphold Democracy in Haiti, September 1994- March 1995.  During November and December 1998 the battalion again supported disaster relief efforts following a hurricane when it deployed to Honduras following Hurricane Mitch.  8th Motor Transport Battalion was deactivated on March 30, 2000.

Reactivation and current operations
2d Transportation Support Battalion was reactivated on October 1, 2014 at MCB Camp Lejeune, North Carolina and assigned to Combat Logistics Regiment 2 and the 2d Marine Logistics Group. The newly formed battalion combines the capabilities formerly found in the 2d Landing Support Battalion and 8th Motor Transport Battalion.  2d TSB maintains 8th Motor Transport Battalion's Lineage and Honors.  Since then, the battalion has regularly provided motor transport companies, landing support platoons, and heavy equipment capabilities throughout the II Marine Expeditionary Force.

Unit awards
A unit citation or commendation is an award bestowed upon an organization for the action cited. Members of the unit who participated in said actions are allowed to wear on their uniforms the awarded unit citation. 2d TSB has been presented with the following awards:
.

2d Transportation Support Battalion also received the 2017 National Defense Transportation Association Military Unit Award:

See also
 List of United States Marine Corps battalions
 Organization of the United States Marine Corps

Citations

References

Web

External links
 2d TSB's official website

Logistics battalions of the United States Marine Corps